Alok Joshi was the  former Secretary of Research and Analysis Wing.

Biography
Hailing from Lucknow, he graduated from Jawaharlal Nehru University, (JNU), completed his postgraduation in political science and then joined the Indian Police Service (IPS), Haryana cadre in 1976. He rose through his ranks and later in 2005 became the joint director of Intelligence Bureau, the internal intelligence agency of India. In 2010 he was appointed as a Special Secretary at R&AW. He took over as Secretary (R) on 30 December 2012. Joshi and Amitabh Mathur of 1977 batch of Manipur and Tripura, IPS cadre were the main contendants for the top spot. Mathur had joined R&AW in 1981 and switched from IPS to RAS cadre. However the Prime Minister-headed Appointments Committee of the Cabinet (India) chose Joshi over Mathur because of his seniority.

References

Indian police officers
Spymasters
Indian spies
Living people
People of the Research and Analysis Wing
Year of birth missing (living people)